The Home Office (HO), also known (especially in official papers and when referred to in Parliament) as the Home Department, is a ministerial department of His Majesty's Government, responsible for immigration, security, and law and order. As such, it is responsible for policing in England and Wales, fire and rescue services in England, visas and immigration, and the Security Service (MI5).  It is also in charge of government policy on security-related issues such as drugs, counter-terrorism, and ID cards.  It was formerly responsible for His Majesty's Prison Service and the National Probation Service, but these have been transferred to the Ministry of Justice. 

The Cabinet minister responsible for the department is the Home Secretary, a post considered one of the Great Offices of State; it has been held since October 2022 by Rt Hon Suella Braverman MP. The Home Office is managed from day to day by a civil servant, the Permanent Under-Secretary of State of the Home Office.

The expenditure, administration, and policy of the Home Office are scrutinised by the Home Affairs Select Committee.

Organisation

The Home Office is headed by the Home Secretary, a Cabinet minister supported by the department's senior civil servant, the permanent secretary.

As of October 2014, the Home Office comprises the following organisations:

Non-ministerial government departments
National Crime Agency (NCA)
Security Service (MI5)

Inspectorates / accountability
HM Inspectorate of Constabulary
Independent Chief Inspector of Borders and Immigration
Independent Office for Police Conduct and other oversight bodies
HM Chief Inspector of Fire Services

Divisions
Border Force
HM Passport Office
Immigration Enforcement
Corporate Services
UK Visas and Immigration
Office for Security and Counter-Terrorism

Non-departmental public bodies
Advisory Council on the Misuse of Drugs
Animals in Science Committee
Disclosure and Barring Service (DBS)
Gangmasters and Labour Abuse Authority
Independent Office for Police Conduct (IOPC), formerly the Independent Police Complaints Commission
Investigatory Powers Tribunal
Migration Advisory Committee
National DNA Database Ethics Group
Office of Surveillance Commissioners
Office of the Immigration Services Commissioner
Police Advisory Board for England and Wales
Police Discipline Appeals Tribunal
Police Remuneration Review Body
Security Industry Authority (SIA)
Surveillance Camera Commissioner
Technical Advisory Board

Operations
A number of functions of the National Policing Improvement Agency were transferred to the Home Office in October 2012, ahead of the future abolition of the agency.

These included:
Use of the Airwave communications system by police forces
The Police National Database
The National DNA Database
Legislative powers regarding police employment
Forensics policy
The National Procurement Hub for information technology

Budget

Contractors
The Home Office outsources a number of contractors to handle specific duties relating to its mission.

Home Office ministers
The Home Office ministers are as follows:

Priorities
The Department outlined its aims for this Parliament in its Business Plan, which was published in May 2011, and superseded its Structural Reform Plan.  The plan said the department will:

1. Empower the public to hold the police to account for their role in cutting crime
Introduce directly elected Police and Crime Commissioners and make police actions to tackle crime and anti-social behaviour more transparent.
2. Free up the police to fight crime more effectively and efficiently
Cut police bureaucracy, end unnecessary central interference and overhaul police powers in order to cut crime, reduce costs and improve police value for money.  Simplify national institutional structures and establish a National Crime Agency to strengthen the fight against organised crime (and replace the Serious Organised Crime Agency).
3. Create a more integrated criminal justice system
Help the police and other public services work together across the criminal justice system.
4. Secure our borders and reduce immigration
Deliver an improved migration system that commands public confidence and serves our economic interests.  Limit non-EU economic migrants, and introduce new measures to reduce inflow and minimise abuse of all migration routes, for example the student route.  Process asylum applications more quickly, and end the detention of children for immigration purposes.
5. Protect people's freedoms and civil liberties
Reverse state interference to ensure there is not disproportionate intrusion into people's lives.
6. Protect our citizens from terrorism
Keep people safe through the Government's approach to counter-terrorism.
7. Build a fairer and more equal society (through the Government Equalities Office)
Help create a fair and flexible labour market.  Change culture and attitudes.  Empower individuals and communities.  Improve equality structures, frontline services and support; and help Government Departments and others to consider equality as a matter of course.

The Home Office publishes progress against the plan on the 10 Downing Street website.

History
On , the Home Office was formed by renaming the existing Southern Department, with all existing staff transferring.  On the same day, the Northern Department was renamed the Foreign Office.

To match the new names, there was a transferring of responsibilities between the two Departments of State.  All domestic responsibilities (including colonies) were moved to the Home Office, and all foreign matters became the concern of the Foreign Office.

Most subsequently created domestic departments (excluding, for instance, those dealing with education) have been formed by splitting responsibilities away from the Home Office.

The initial responsibilities were:

Answering petitions and addresses sent to the King
Advising the King on
Royal grants
Warrants and commissions
The exercise of Royal Prerogative
Issuing instructions on behalf of the King to officers of The Crown, lords-lieutenant and magistrates, mainly concerning law and order
Operation of the secret service within the UK
Protecting the public
Safeguarding the rights and liberties of individuals
Colonial matters

Responsibilities were subsequently changed over the years that followed:
1793 added: regulation of aliens
1794 removed: control of military forces (to Secretary of State for War)
1801 removed: colonial business (to Secretary of State for War and the Colonies)
1804 removed: Barbary State consuls (to Secretary of State for War and the Colonies)
1823 added: prisons
1829 added: Metropolitan Police and other police services
1836 added: registration of births, deaths and marriages in England and Wales
1844 added: naturalisation
1845 added: registration of Friendly Societies
1855 removed: yeomanries and militias (to War Office)
1858 added: local boards of health
1871 removed: local boards of health (to Local Government Board)
1871 removed: registration of births, deaths and marriages (to Local Government Board)
1872 removed: highways and turnpikes (to Local Government Board)
1875 added: control of explosives
1875 removed: registration of Friendly Societies (to Treasury)
1885 removed: Scotland (to Secretary for Scotland and the Scottish Office)
1886 removed: fishing (to Board of Trade)
1889 removed: Land Commissioners (to Board of Agriculture)
1900 removed: matters relating to burial grounds (to Local Government Board)
1905 removed: public housing (to Local Government Board)
1914 added: dangerous drugs
1919 removed: aircraft and air traffic (to Air Ministry)
1919 removed: use of human bodies in medical training (to Ministry of Health)
1919 removed: infant and child care (to Ministry of Health)
1919 removed: lunacy and mental health (to Ministry of Health)
1919 removed: health and safety (to Ministry of Health)
1920 added: firearms
1920 removed: Representation of Britain abroad in labour matters (to Ministry of Labour)
1920 removed: mining (to Mines Department)
1920 added: Northern Ireland
1921 added: elections (from the Ministry of Health)
1922 removed: relations with Irish Free State (to Colonial Office)
1923 removed: Order of the British Empire (to Treasury)
1925 removed: registration of trade unions (to Ministry of Labour)
1931 removed: county councils (to Ministry of Health)
1933 added: poisons
1934 removed: metropolitan boroughs (to Ministry of Health)
1935 added: Civil Defence Service
1937 removed: road accident returns (to Ministry of Transport)
1938 added: fire services
1938 removed: Imperial Service Order and medal (to Treasury)
1940 removed: factory inspections (to Ministry of Labour)
1945 removed: workmen's compensation scheme (to Ministry of National Insurance)
1947 added: infant and child care (from Ministry of Health)
1947 removed: regulation of advertisements (to Ministry of Town and Country Planning)
1947 removed: burial fees (to Ministry of Health)
1947 removed: registration of building societies (to Treasury)
1948 removed: Broadmoor hospital (to Lunacy Board of Control)
1949 added: Civil Defence Corps
1950 removed: structural precautions for civil defence (to Ministry of Works)
1950 removed: minor judicial appointments (to Lord Chancellor)
1953 removed: slaughterhouses (to Ministry of Housing and Local Government)
1954 removed: markets (to Ministry of Housing and Local Government)
1956 removed: railway accidents (to Ministry of Transport and Civil Aviation)
1969 removed: reservoirs (to Ministry of Housing and Local Government)
1971 removed: child care in England (to Department of Health and Social Security)
1971 removed: child care in Wales (to Welsh Office)
1972 removed: Northern Ireland Department of the Home Office (to Northern Ireland Office)
1973 removed: adoption (to Department of Health and Social Security)
1992 removed: broadcasting and sport (to the new Department of National Heritage – later the Department for Culture, Media and Sport)
2000 removed: Metropolitan Police (to Metropolitan Police Authority - later Mayor's Office for Policing and Crime)
2001 removed: Crown Dependencies (to Lord Chancellor's Department – now Ministry of Justice)
2007 removed: Home Office Drugs Inspectorate branch, formed in 1934
2007 removed: criminal justice, prisons & probation and legal affairs (to new Ministry of Justice)
2007 added: counter-terrorism strategy (from the Cabinet Office)
2016 added: fire and rescue services in England (from the Department for Communities and Local Government)

The Home Office retains a variety of functions that have not found a home elsewhere and sit oddly with the main law-and-order focus of the department, such as regulation of British Summer Time.

Recent incidents

Union action
On 18 July 2012, the Public and Commercial Services Union announced that thousands of Home Office employees would go on strike over jobs, pay and other issues.  The union called off the strike; it claimed the department had, consequent to the threat of actions, announced 1,100 new border jobs.

Windrush scandal
The first allegations about the unfair targeting of pre-1973 Caribbean migrants started in 2013. In 2018, the allegations were put to the Home Secretary in the House of Commons, and resulted in the resignation of the then Home Secretary. The Windrush scandal resulted in some British citizens being wrongly deported, and being refused life critical medical treatment, along with a further compensation scheme for those affected, and a wider debate on the Home Office hostile environment policy.

Aderonke Apata 
Aderonke Apata, a Nigerian LGBT activist, made two asylum claims that were both rejected by the Home Office in 2014 and on 1 April 2015 respectively, due to her previously having been in a relationship with a man and having children with that man. In 2014, Apata said that she would send an explicit video of herself to the Home Office to prove her sexuality. This resulted in her asylum bid gaining widespread support, with multiple petitions created in response, which gained hundreds of thousands of signatures combined.

On 8 August 2017, after a thirteen-year legal battle and after a new appeal from Apata was scheduled for late July, she was granted refugee status in the United Kingdom by the Home Office.

Location
Until 1978, the Home Office had its offices in what is now the Foreign and Commonwealth Office Main Building on King Charles Street, off Whitehall.  From 1978 to 2004, the Home Office was then located at 50 Queen Anne's Gate, a Brutalist office block in Westminster designed by Sir Basil Spence, close to St James's Park tube station.  Many functions, however, were devolved to offices in other parts of London, and the country, notably the headquarters of the Immigration and Nationality Directorate in Croydon.

In 2005, the Home Office moved to a new main office designed by Sir Terry Farrell at 2 Marsham Street, Westminster, on the site of the demolished Marsham Towers building of the Department of the Environment.

For external shots of its fictional Home Office, the TV series Spooks uses an aerial shot of the Government Offices Great George Street instead, serving as stand-in to match the distinctly less modern appearance of the fictitious accommodation interiors the series uses.

Research
To meet the UK's five-year science and technology strategy, the Home Office sponsors research in police sciences, including:
Biometrics – including face and voice recognition
Cell type analysis – to determine the origin of cells (e.g. hair, skin)
Chemistry – new techniques to recover latent fingerprints
DNA – identifying offender characteristics from DNA
Improved profiling – of illicit drugs to help identify their source
Raman Spectroscopy – to provide more sensitive drugs and explosives detectors (e.g. roadside drug detection)
Terahertz imaging methods and technologies – e.g. image analysis and new cameras, to detect crime, enhance images and support anti-terrorism

Devolution
Most front-line law and order policy areas, such as policing and criminal justice, are devolved in Scotland and Northern Ireland (and only very partially in Wales), but the following reserved and excepted matters are handled by Westminster.

Northern Ireland
Excepted matters:

Extradition (as an international relations matter)
Immigration and nationality

The following matters were not transferred at the devolution of policing and justice on 12 April 2010, and remain reserved:

Drug classification
Parades
Security of explosives
National Crime Agency

The Home Office's main counterparts in Northern Ireland are:

Department of Justice (policing, public order and community safety)
Northern Ireland Office (national security in Northern Ireland)

The Department of Justice is accountable to the Northern Ireland Executive, whereas the Northern Ireland Office is a UK government department.

Scotland
Reserved matters:
The Misuse of Drugs Act 1971
Extradition legislation, but the Scottish Ministers (through the Crown Office and Procurator Fiscal Service) have executive responsibility for all aspects of mutual legal assistance
Most aspects of firearms legislation, but Scottish Ministers have some executive responsibilities for the licensing of firearms; further powers are transferred under the Scotland Act 2012
Immigration and nationality
Scientific procedures on live animals.

The Scottish Government Justice and Communities Directorates are responsible for devolved justice and home affairs policy.

Wales
Reserved matters:

Policing
Drug Abuse
Data Protection and access to information
Elections
Firearms
Film Classification
Immigration and Nationality
Scientific Procedures on live animals
National Security and Counter-Terrorism
Betting, Gaming and Lotteries
Emergency Powers
Extradition
Lieutenancies
Charities

Criticism

In March 2019, it was reported that in two unrelated cases, the Home Office denied asylum to converted Christians by misrepresenting certain Bible quotes.  In one case, it quoted selected excerpts from the Bible to imply that Christianity is not more peaceful than Islam, the religion the asylum-seeker converted from. In another incident, an Iranian Christian application for asylum was rejected because her faith was judged as "half-hearted", for she did not believe that Jesus could protect her from the Iranian regime.  As outrage grew on social media, the Home Office distanced itself from the decision, though it confirmed the letter was authentic. The Home Secretary said that it was "totally unacceptable" for his department to quote the Bible to question an Iranian Christian convert's asylum application, and ordered an urgent investigation into what had happened.

The treatment of Christian asylum seekers chimes with other incidents in the past, such as the refusal to grant visas to the Archbishop of Mosul to attend the consecration of the UK's first Syriac Orthodox Cathedral. In a 2017 study, the Christian Barnabas Fund found that only 0.2% of all Syrian refugees accepted by the UK were Christians, although Christians accounted for approximately 10% of Syria's pre-war population.

In 2019, the Home Office admitted to multiple breaches of data protection regulations in the handling of its Windrush compensation scheme.  The department sent emails to Windrush migrants which revealed the email address of other Windrush migrants to whom the email was sent.  The data breach concerned five different emails, each of which was sent to 100 recipients.  In April 2019, the Home Office admitted to revealing 240 personal email addresses of EU citizens applying for settled status in the UK.  The email addresses of applicants were incorrectly sent to other applicants to the scheme. In response to these incidents, the Home Office pledged to launch an independent review of its data protection compliance.

In 2019, the Court of Appeal issued a judgement which criticised the Home Office's handling of immigration cases.  The judges stated that the "general approach [by the home secretary, Sajid Javid] in all earnings discrepancy cases [has been] legally flawed".  The judgement relates to the Home Office's interpretation of Section 322(5) of the Immigration Rules.

In November 2020, the Equality and Human Rights Commission, a statutory body that investigates breaches of the Equality Act 2010 published a report concluding that the Home Office had a "lack of organisation-wide commitment, including by senior leadership, to the importance of equality and the Home Office's obligations under the equality duty placed on government departments". The report noted that the Home Office's pursuit of the "hostile environment" policy from 2012 onwards "accelerated the impact of decades of complex policy and practice based on a history of white and black immigrants being treated differently". Caroline Waters, the interim chair of the EHRC, described the treatment of Windrush immigrants by the Home Office as a "shameful stain on British history".

See also

Home Office Large Major Enquiry System 2 (HOLMES 2)
John Gieve
Law enforcement in the United Kingdom
List of home secretaries
Ministry of Home Security
Parliamentary Under-Secretary of State for the Home Department
Permanent Under-Secretary of State of the Home Office
UK Immigration Service

References

External links 

 
 Records created or inherited by the Home Office, Ministry of Home Security, and related bodies — gives a history of responsibilities of the Home Office, including which functions were merged into or transferred away from the Home Office

 
Ministerial departments of the Government of the United Kingdom
English law
United Kingdom
Law enforcement in England and Wales
United Kingdom
Ministries established in 1782
1782 establishments in Great Britain